The discography of English rock band Blur consists of eight studio albums, five live albums, five compilation albums, one remix album, two video albums, four extended plays, 34 singles, 10 promotional singles and 37 music videos. Formed in London in 1988, the group consists of singer/keyboardist Damon Albarn, guitarist/singer Graham Coxon, bassist Alex James and drummer Dave Rowntree. Three years later, their debut release, the Madchester and shoegazing-tinged Leisure (1991), peaked at number seven on the UK Albums Chart. Modern Life Is Rubbish (1993) inaugurated the Britpop phase of their career. Its multi-Platinum follow-ups Parklife (1994) and The Great Escape (1995) helped the band achieve mainstream popularity in Britain; every Blur studio album from Parklife onwards has topped the British charts.

Albums

Studio albums

Live albums

Compilation albums

Remix albums

Video albums

Extended plays

Box sets

Singles

Promotional singles

Other charted songs

Other appearances

Videography

Music videos

Documentaries

Notes

See also 
 Damon Albarn discography
 The Good, the Bad & the Queen discography
 Gorillaz discography
 Graham Coxon discography

References

External links
 Official website
 Blur at AllMusic
 
 

Discographies of British artists
Discography